Jakub Sedláček (born 5 April 1990) is a Czech professional ice hockey goaltender who currently playing for HC '05 Banská Bystrica of the Slovak Extraliga.

Career
He previously played with Zlín through (2007-2013) and HK Hradec Králové (shortly, at the beginning of the 2017-2018 season) in the Czech Extraliga. He also played four years with the Dinamo Riga of Kontinental Hockey League (2013-2017) and briefly in 2017 with HC Bolzano of the EBEL before returning to the KHL with HC Slovan Bratislava on December 12, 2017.

References

External links
 

1990 births
Living people
Bolzano HC players
Czech ice hockey goaltenders
Dinamo Riga players
HC Slovan Bratislava players
HC Kometa Brno players
HC Sparta Praha players
PSG Berani Zlín players
Sportspeople from Zlín
HC Košice players
EC VSV players
HC Olomouc players
Stadion Hradec Králové players
HC ZUBR Přerov players

HC '05 Banská Bystrica players
Czech expatriate ice hockey players in Slovakia
Czech expatriate sportspeople in Latvia
Expatriate ice hockey players in Latvia
Czech expatriate sportspeople in Austria
Expatriate ice hockey players in Austria
Czech expatriate sportspeople in Italy
Expatriate ice hockey players in Italy